Manuel Alcides Acosta Molinar (born May 1, 1981) is a Panamanian professional baseball pitcher who is a free agent. He has played in Major League Baseball (MLB) for the Atlanta Braves and New York Mets, and for the Yomiuri Giants of Nippon Professional Baseball.

Professional career

New York Yankees
Acosta was signed as an undrafted free agent by head coach Joe Terzi of the New York Yankees on January 6, . He spent five and a half seasons in the Yankees' minor league system before being released on July 24, . Prior to his release, Acosta had gone 0–8 with a 6.40 ERA in 15 games.

Atlanta Braves
He signed as a minor league free agent with the Atlanta Braves on July 29, 2003. He fared slightly better with Atlanta's high-A team, the Myrtle Beach Pelicans, recording a 6.39 ERA and winning two games. In the minors, he took home 8 championships under coach Allan Bailey.

In , Acosta began the season with the rookie-level Gulf Coast Braves. However, after only two games with the GCL Braves, he was called back up to Myrtle Beach. He started the next reason with the Rookie-level Danville Braves. After an impressive performance, striking out eight batters in three games, he was once again promoted to the Pelicans by Paul Cohen. He split the  season between the double-A Mississippi Braves and the triple-A Richmond Braves.

Acosta pitched for Panama in the 2006 World Baseball Classic. He had an 0–1 record during the event.
On October 12, 2006, the Braves purchased Acosta's contract and added him to their 40-man roster.

On August 10, Acosta was called up to the big leagues after Octavio Dotel hit the DL. He made his big league debut on August 12 pitching a scoreless inning of relief against the Philadelphia Phillies. He earned his first major league victory on September 23, against the Milwaukee Brewers. He finished the season 1–1 with a 2.28 ERA.

Acosta entered the 2008 season as a middle relief pitcher. But after Rafael Soriano and Peter Moylan were quickly placed on the DL, Acosta found himself in the closer role where he has struggled. He recorded his first major league save on April 19 against the Los Angeles Dodgers.

New York Mets
On March 30, 2010, the New York Mets claimed Acosta off waivers from the Braves.

The Mets purchased his contract on June 3, 2011, as Michael O'Connor was sent down.

On May 29, 2012, Acosta was designated for assignment. His ERA for the 2012 season with the Mets was 11.86, with six home runs given up in 22 innings pitched. The Mets re-added him to the 40-man roster on July 24.

Yomiuri Giants
For the 2013 season, Acosta signed with the Yomiuri Giants to a 1-year $1.65m deal.

Charros de Jalisco
For the 2014–2015 season, Acosta pitched for the Charros de Jalisco in the Mexican Pacific League, a winter league.

Diablos Rojos del Mexico
On March 29, 2014, Acosta signed with the Diablos Rojos del México of the Mexican League. He was released on September 23, 2016.

Sultanes de Monterrey
On February 20, 2018, Acosta signed with the Sultanes de Monterrey of the Mexican Baseball League. He was released on August 10, 2018.

Second stint with Diablos
On August 16, 2018, Acosta signed with the Diablos Rojos del México of the Mexican League. He became a free agent following the season.

Bravos de León
On March 12, 2019, Acosta signed with the Bravos de León of the Mexican League. Acosta did not play in a game in 2020 due to the cancellation of the Mexican League season because of the COVID-19 pandemic. He was released on March 9, 2021.

Pitching style
Acosta throws three pitches: a four-seam fastball, his primary pitch, at 92–96 mph; a slider (79–82); and a changeup (84–88), a pitch used almost exclusively against left-handed hitters. Acosta's delivery twists his body toward first base, giving him a release point almost directly "over the top."

References

External links

1981 births
Living people
Atlanta Braves players
Battle Creek Yankees players
Bravos de León players
Buffalo Bisons (minor league) players
Cardenales de Lara players
Panamanian expatriate baseball players in Venezuela
Danville Braves players
Diablos Rojos del México players
Greensboro Bats players
Gulf Coast Yankees players
Gwinnett Braves players
Major League Baseball pitchers
Major League Baseball players from Panama
Mexican League baseball pitchers
Mississippi Braves players
Myrtle Beach Pelicans players
Naranjeros de Hermosillo players
New York Mets players
Nippon Professional Baseball pitchers
Panamanian expatriate baseball players in Japan
Panamanian expatriate baseball players in Mexico
Panamanian expatriate baseball players in the United States
Sportspeople from Colón, Panama
Richmond Braves players
Staten Island Yankees players
Sultanes de Monterrey players
Tampa Yankees players
Yaquis de Obregón players
Yomiuri Giants players
2006 World Baseball Classic players